Samuels Point is a cliff located in the Catskill Mountains of New York west-northwest of Olivebridge. Mount Pleasant is located north, and South Mountain is located south-southeast of Samuels Point.

References

Mountains of Ulster County, New York
Mountains of New York (state)